Johann Georg Schmidt (c.1685 – 15 September 1748) was an Austrian Baroque painter.  To distinguish him from his better-known namesake Martin Johann Schmidt from Krems (Kremser Schmidt) he was also known as the "Viennese Schmidt" (Wiener Schmidt). 

Johann Georg Schmidt was born in Bohemia.  He was educated in the studio of Peter Strudel and was influenced by Martino Altomonte.  He often worked with architects such as Johann Lucas von Hildebrandt.  He worked especially in Lower Austria and Vienna, on high altarpieces and other paintings, in places such as the Franciscan Church, Vienna, Altenburg Abbey, Klosterneuburg Priory, Lilienfeld Abbey and Zwettl Abbey.  He died in Krems.

External links
aeiou (Austrian Encyclopedia): Johann Georg Schmidt 
Lexikon des Niederösterreichischen Landesmuseums: Johann Georg Schmidt 

1685 births
1748 deaths
18th-century Austrian painters
18th-century Austrian male artists
Austrian male painters
German Bohemian people
Baroque painters